True North (foaled 1940) was a successful American Thoroughbred racehorse for which the True North Handicap at Belmont Park is named.

Background
True North was bred and raced by businessman W. Deering Howe, a grandson of Charles Deering, Chairman of the Board of Directors and a founding major shareholder in International Harvester. True North was trained by future U.S. Racing Hall of Fame inductee,  Preston M. Burch.

Racing career
True North's wins included the Fall Highweight Handicap in 1945 and the Interborough Handicap in 1946.

Pedigree

References

1940 racehorse births
Thoroughbred family 4-k
Racehorses bred in the United States
Racehorses trained in the United States